Niranam diocese, the smallest and one of the oldest dioceses of the Jacobite Syrian Christian Church, is located in Niranam, India. Niranam is one of the places where St. Thomas the Apostle preached in the 1st century.

History

Niranam diocese was established by Patriarch Peter IV, the Patriarch of Antioch during his apostolic visit to India in 1876 at the historic Mulanthuruthy Synod. Geevarghese Gregorios of Parumala was ordained as its first metropolitan. Later in 1987, Mor Gregorios declared a saint by Ignatius Zakka I Patriarch of Antioch for Syriac Orthodox Church of India.

The Diocese of Niranam has now been made an independent diocese headquarter at St. Gregorios Church and the Patriarchal Center of Parumala.  The Present Niranam Diocese Metropolitan is Geevarghese Mor Coorilose, who was consecrated as bishop on 3 July 2006 at St. Thomas Church of Paravur. The present Auxiliary Metropolitan is Geevarghese Mor Barnabas of Niranam Diocese.

Diocesan Metropolitans

Parishes
Parumala St. Gregorios Church and Patriarchal Center, Pathanamthitta Dist, Kerala
Chennithala St. George Horeb Jacobite Syrian Church, Chennithala, Eramathoor P.O, Mannar Alapuzha Dist, Kerala - 689 622
Anjilithanam, St. Mary's Jacobite Syrian Church Anjilithanam, Thiruvalla Pthanamthitta Dist, Kerala -689 101
Cheppadu St. George Jacobite Syrian Church Cheppadu P.O, Alappuzha Dist, Kerala - 690 507
Kallooppara, St. Gregorious Jacobite Syrian Church Kallooppara P.O., Thiruvalla Pathanamthitta Dist, Kerala
Kavumbhagam, St. George Jacobite Syrian Church Kavumbhagam P.O, Thiruvalla Pathanamthitta Dist, Kerala - 689 101
Kunnamthanam, St. Peters Jacobite Syrian Church Kunnamthanam P.O., Thiruvalla Pathanamthitta Dist, Kerala - 689 581
Mazhuvangadu, St. Mary's Jacobite Syrian Church Mazhuvangadu P.O., Thiruvalla -1 Pathanamthitta Dist
Mepral, St. Johns Jacobite Syrian Church Mepral P.O, Thiruvalla Pathanamthitta Dist, Kerala - 689 591
Puramattam, St. George Jacobite Syrian Church Puramattam P.O., Eraviperoor, Thiruvalla, Pathanamthitta Dist Kerala - 689 543
Paramkal, St. Mary's Jacobite Syrian Church Paramkal, Palakathakidy P.O., Kunnamthanam, Thiruvalla Pathanamthitta Dist

References

External links 
 Niranam Diocese

Jacobite Syrian Christian Church
Oriental Orthodoxy in India
19th-century Oriental Orthodox church buildings
19th-century churches in India